Denis Alexandrovich Grachev (born August 3, 1982) is a Russian boxer, kickboxer, and mixed martial artist residing in the United States. Grachev was the IKF Muay Thai world light cruiserweight champion.

Biography
Grachev was born in 1982 in the city of Chaykovsky, Perm Oblast, Russian SFSR, Soviet Union. Grachev started training in kickboxing at the age of 14 and was trained by Gregory Golubkova, Mikhail Stepanov, Alik Basharov, Vyacheslav Tutubalina, Yuri Vtyurina and Vladimir Lavrov throughout the years. In 2005, Grachev graduated from the Chaykovsky State Institute of Physical Culture with a bachelor's degree in Physical Education.

In 2006, Grachev moved to San Diego, California, United States with Evgeny Khil — long-time friend and fellow kickboxer — after appointing Mark Dion of City Boxing as his manager. Grachev would represent City Boxing's professional fight team, as well as being the gym's kickboxing instructor. Although competing mostly under low kick/international and full contact rules, Grachev competed under Muay Thai rules while in the United States. When Grachev first moved into the United States, he had no understanding of English at all and was enrolled in English classes at San Diego City College by his manager Mark Dion. At this stage of Grachev's migration into the United States, he had been dabbling in mixed martial arts and boxing — his manager Mark Dion had plans of moving Grachev's career away from kickboxing since there was little money in the sport. Due to the lack of popularity of kickboxing in the United States, Denis Grachev eventually made the full-time commitment to boxing in 2011 and is primarily trained by former IBF minimumweight world champion Manny Melchor. Grachev states he has always enjoyed boxing, though resorted to kickboxing while growing up in Russia because there weren't any good boxing gyms in Chaykovsky.

Kickboxing career
As an amateur in kickboxing, Grachev achieved a record of 123-18, with 40 of his wins coming by way of (T)KO. In the 2004 WKA/IAKSA Amateur World Championships in Basel, Switzerland — the first joint federation world championship — Grachev won the bronze medal under low kick/international rules. The following year in WAKO's Amateur World Championships in Szeged, Hungary, Grachev won the gold medal under full contact rules, also earning the classification of International Master of Sport in kickboxing.

During his professional career in Russia, Grachev competed most of his bouts in World BARS Kickboxing Federation. On September 13, 2006, he won WBKF's vacant Commonwealth of Independent States -81 kg championship under international/low kick rules when he defeated Denis Goncharenko of Belarus.

After moving to the United States in 2006, Grachev competed in his first kickboxing bout under Muay Thai rules against kickboxing legend Manson Gibson on July 7, 2007. The bout was for International Kickboxing Federation's Muay Thai light cruiserweight world championship. Grachev went on to win the world title with a third round TKO over Gibson after Gibson's corner threw in the towel from too much punishment.

On November 29, 2007, Grachev took on WBC Muaythai light heavyweight world champion Joe Schilling — who is currently renowned for being a sparring partner of mixed martial arts world champion Nick Diaz. Grachev defeated Schilling with a 47-second knockout in the first round after Grachev delivered a spinning heel kick to the body, as Schilling was unable to beat the referee's 10-count. In result, Grachev won IKKC's vacant U.S. super middleweight national championship.

Boxing career
Denis Grachev made the transition to boxing in 2007 when he faced Rosendo Rubalcaba on June 24 — the professional debut for both combatants. Grachev won his professional debut with a second round knockout after knocking down Rubalcaba a total of four times the entire bout.

On December 11, 2009 (in a 6-round fight), Grachev fought to a controversial majority draw against Ernesto Castaneda in a fight where he was the effective aggressor, more ring-general, landed more punches and the harder punches in a majority of the rounds, and the fact that almost every ringside observer thought that Grachev had done enough to win. One judge scored it in his favour, with the other to judges scoring the fight even.

On July 4, 2011, Grachev went on to capture his first major championship in boxing when he defeated Eddie Caminero with a third round TKO and becoming the WBC Continental Americas light heavyweight champion.

On April 27, 2012, Grachev took on then-reigning NABF light heavyweight champion Ismayl Sillakh. At the time, Sillakh was a consensus top-10 ranked light heavyweight and was going into the bout as a heavy 11 to 1 odds favorite over Grachev. After being knocked down in the third round by Sillakh, as well as losing most rounds on the judges' scorecards, Grachev rallied an upset of the year TKO victory in the 8th round; also becoming the new NABF light heavyweight champion

Denis Grachev put his NABF light heavyweight title against former IBF super middleweight world champion Lucian Bute on November 3, 2012. The bout took place in Bute's hometown. Despite a tough, solid effort over 12 rounds, Grachev lost by unanimous decision. Though some believed that Grachev won the majority of the rounds (and therefore the fight) with his sheer aggression and the fact that he landed more punches, most analysts and ringside observers agreed and believed that Bute had the upper hand throughout the bout, as he out-boxed Grachev throughout a majority of the rounds of the fight and managed to land the harder punches of both of the fighters.

On March 30, 2013, Grachev added another big name to his boxing resume when he fought Zsolt Erdei in a 10-round fight and defeated him via split decision.

Championships and accomplishments

Boxing
Golden Gloves Ltd
2013 Monte-Carlo Million Dollar Super Four Tournament Runner-up
World Boxing Council
NABF Light Heavyweight Championship (One time)
WBC Continental Americas Light Heavyweight Championship (One time)
2012 NABF Upset of the Year vs. Ismayl Sillakh on April 27

Kickboxing
International Kickboxing Federation
IKF Muay Thai World Light Cruiserweight Championship (One time)
International Karate Kickboxing Council
IKKC Muay Thai United States Super Middleweight Championship (One time)
World BARS Kickboxing Federation
WBKF Low Kick Commonwealth of Independent States -81 kg Championship (One time)
WBKF Low Kick Commonwealth of Independent States -86 kg Championship (One time)
World Association of Kickboxing Organizations
2005 WAKO Amateur World Championships Full Contact Light Heavyweight Gold Medalist
2000 WAKO Amateur Junior World Championships Low Kick Light Middleweight Gold Medalist
World Kickboxing Association/International Amateur Kickboxing Sports Association
2004 WKA/IAKSA Amateur World Championships Low Kick Light Heavyweight Bronze Medalist
Kickboxing Federation of Russia
2006 Russia Amateur National Championships Full Contact Bronze Medalist
2006 Russia Amateur National Championships Low Kick Gold Medalist
2006 Russia Amateur National Championships Light Contact Gold Medalist
2005 Russia Amateur National Championships Full Contact Gold Medalist
2004 Russia Amateur National Championships Light Contact Gold Medalist
2001 Cup of Peter International Tournament Low Kick Gold Medalist
Federal Executive Body in the Field of Physical Culture & Sports
International Master of Sport (2001)

Professional boxing record

| style="text-align:center;" colspan="8"|13 Wins (8 knockouts, 4 decisions), 5 Losses, 1 Draw
|-
|align=center style="border-style: none none solid solid; background: #e3e3e3"|Res.
|align=center style="border-style: none none solid solid; background: #e3e3e3"|Record
|align=center style="border-style: none none solid solid; background: #e3e3e3"|Opponent
|align=center style="border-style: none none solid solid; background: #e3e3e3"|Type
|align=center style="border-style: none none solid solid; background: #e3e3e3"|Rd., Time
|align=center style="border-style: none none solid solid; background: #e3e3e3"|Date
|align=center style="border-style: none none solid solid; background: #e3e3e3"|Location
|align=center style="border-style: none none solid solid; background: #e3e3e3"|Notes
|-
|Loss 
|13–5–1
| Thomas Oosthuizen
| align=center|RTD
| align=center|11 (12)
| align=center|2014-11-15
| Emperors Palace, Kempton Park, South Africa
| 
|-
|Loss 
|13–4–1
| Ryno Liebenberg
| align=center|UD
| align=center|12
| align=center|2014-08-09
| Emperors Palace, Kempton Park, South Africa
| 
|-
|Loss 
|13–3–1
| Isaac Chilemba
| align=center|UD
| align=center|10
| align=center|2014-03-15
| Sands Casino Resort Bethlehem, Bethlehem, Pennsylvania, U.S.
| 
|-
|Loss
|13–2–1
| Edwin Rodriguez
| align=center|TKO
| align=center|1 (10), 2:50
| align=center|2013-07-13
| Salle des Etoiles, Monte-Carlo, Monaco
| 
|-
|Win
|13–1–1
| Zsolt Erdei
| align=center|SD
| align=center|10
| align=center|2013-03-30
| Salle des Etoiles, Monte-Carlo, Monaco
| 
|-
|Loss
|12–1–1
| Lucian Bute
| align=center|UD
| align=center|12
| align=center|2012-11-03
| Centre Bell, Montréal, Québec, Canada
| 
|-
|Win
|12–0–1
| Ismayl Sillakh
| align=center|TKO
| align=center|8 (10), 2:18
| align=center|2012-04-27
| Frank Erwin Center, Austin, Texas, U.S.
| 
|-
|Win
|11–0–1
| Eddie Caminero
| align=center|TKO
| align=center|3 (10), 1:29
| align=center|2011-07-09
| Seminole Hard Rock Hotel and Casino Hollywood, Hollywood, Florida, U.S.
| 
|-
|Win
|10–0–1
| Vladine Biosse
| align=center|TKO
| align=center|4 (10), 2:56
| align=center|2011-05-06
| Foxwoods Resort Casino, Mashantucket, Connecticut, U.S.
| 
|-
|Win
|9–0–1
| Azea Augustama
| align=center|MD
| align=center|8
| align=center|2011-01-14
| Magic City Casino, Miami, Florida, U.S.
| 
|-
|Draw
|8–0–1
| Ernesto Castaneda
| align=center|MD
| align=center|6
| align=center|2009-12-11
| Memorial Auditorium, Sacramento, California, U.S.
| 
|-
|Win
|8–0
| Roberto Baro
| align=center|KO
| align=center|3 (6), 2:58
| align=center|2009-11-12
| Four Points Sheraton Hotel, San Diego, California, U.S.
| 
|-
|Win
|7–0
| Carlos Raul Ibarra
| align=center|MD
| align=center|6
| align=center|2009-08-27
| Four Points Sheraton Hotel, San Diego, California, U.S.
| 
|-
|Win
|6–0
| Ayodeji Fadeyi
| align=center|TKO
| align=center|4 (6), 1:00
| align=center|2009-04-30
| 4th and B, San Diego, California, U.S.
| 
|-
|Win
|5–0
| Thomas Haines
| align=center|TKO
| align=center|3 (6), 0:54
| align=center|2008-10-23
| Four Points Sheraton Hotel, San Diego, California, U.S.
| 
|-
|Win
|4–0
| Caleb Caldwell
| align=center|KO
| align=center|2 (4), 2:26
| align=center|2008-07-24
| 4th and B, San Diego, California, U.S.
| 
|-
|Win
|3–0
| Freeman Taft
| align=center|UD
| align=center|4
| align=center|2007-10-11
| Oceanview Pavilion, Port Hueneme, California, U.S.
| 
|-
| Win
|2–0
| Robert Ryan
| align=center|UD
| align=center|4
| align=center|2007-07-29
| Quiet Cannon, Montebello, California, U.S.
| 
|-
| Win
|1–0
| Rosendo Rubalcaba
| align=center|KO
| align=center|2 (4), 2:06
| align=center|2007-06-24
| Del Mar Fairgrounds, Del Mar, California, U.S.
| 
|-

Kickboxing record (Incomplete)

|-
|- bgcolor="#CCFFCC"
| 
| align='center'|Win
|  Fernando Gonzalez
| WCK: Full Rules Muay Thai
|  Pala, California
| align='center'|UD
| align='center'|5
| align='center'|3:00
|-
|- bgcolor="#CCFFCC"
| 
| align='center'|Win
|  Joe Schilling
| WCK: Full Rules Muay Thai
|  Pala, California
| align='center'|KO
| align='center'|1
| align='center'|0:47
|-
! style=background:white colspan=9 |
|-
|- bgcolor="#CCFFCC"
| 
| align='center'|Win
|  Manson Gibson
| WCK: Full Rules Muay Thai
|  Inglewood, California
| align='center'|TKO
| align='center'|3
| align='center'|0:27
|-
! style=background:white colspan=9 |
|-
|- bgcolor="#CCFFCC"
| 
| align='center'|Win
|  Denis Goncharenko
| BARS: CIS Middleweight Championship 2006
|  Moscow, Moscow Oblast
| align='center'|UD
| align='center'|8
| align='center'|3:00
|-
! style=background:white colspan=9 |
|-
|- bgcolor="#CCFFCC"
| 
| align='center'|Win
|  Andrey Gerasimchuk
| BARS: Eurasian Super Heavyweight Championship 2006
|  Moscow, Moscow Oblast
| align='center'|UD
| align='center'|3
| align='center'|3:00
|-
|- bgcolor="#CCFFCC"
| 
| align='center'|Win
|  Alexander Shlakunov
| BARS: Yashinov vs Zhuravlev
|  Moscow, Moscow Oblast
| align='center'|UD
| align='center'|3
| align='center'|3:00
|-
|- bgcolor="#CCFFCC"
| 
| align='center'|Win
|  Pavel Turuk
| BARS: European Welterweight Championship 2006
|  Moscow, Moscow Oblast
| align='center'|UD
| align='center'|3
| align='center'|3:00
|-
|- bgcolor="#CCFFCC"
| 
| align='center'|Win
|  Alexander Romaschenko
| BARS: European Super Heavyweight Championship 2006
|  Moscow, Moscow Oblast
| align='center'|UD
| align='center'|3
| align='center'|3:00
|-
|- bgcolor="#CCFFCC"
| 
| align='center'|Win
|  Kirill Ivanov
| World BARS Kickboxing Federation
|  Perm, Perm Oblast
| align='center'|UD
| align='center'|3
| align='center'|3:00
|-
! style=background:white colspan=9 |
|-
|- bgcolor="#CCFFCC"
| 
| align='center'|Win
|  Alexander Svitin
| BARS: Zdragush vs Podolyachin
|  Moscow, Moscow Oblast
| align='center'|UD
| align='center'|3
| align='center'|3:00
|-
|- bgcolor="#ffbbbb"
| 
| align='center'|Loss
|  Oleg Utenin
| World BARS Kickboxing Federation
|  Dedovsk, Moscow Oblast
| align='center'|SD
| align='center'|8
| align='center'|3:00
|-
! style=background:white colspan=9 |
|-
|- bgcolor="#CCFFCC"
| 
| align='center'|Win
|  Alexander Shlakunov
| World BARS Kickboxing Federation
|  Moscow, Moscow Oblast
| align='center'|UD
| align='center'|3
| align='center'|3:00
|-
|- bgcolor="#ffbbbb"
| 
| align='center'|Loss
|  Mikhail Chalykh
| BARS: Shvoev vs Tsgoev
|  Moscow, Moscow Oblast
| align='center'|UD
| align='center'|3
| align='center'|3:00
|-
|- bgcolor="#ffbbbb"
| 
| align='center'|Loss
|  Dmitry Borulko
| World BARS Kickboxing Federation
|  Moscow, Moscow Oblast
| align='center'|UD
| align='center'|3
| align='center'|3:00
|-
|- bgcolor="#CCFFCC"
| 
| align='center'|Win
|  Vladimir Todorov
| World BARS Kickboxing Federation
|  Moscow, Moscow Oblast
| align='center'|SD
| align='center'|3
| align='center'|3:00
|-
|-
| colspan=9 | Legend:

Mixed martial arts record

|-
| Loss
|align=center| 3–1
|  Ricardo Funch
| Decision (unanimous)
| Cage Fight MMA 2: Blunt Force Trauma
| 
|align=center| 3
|align=center| 5:00
| Manchester, New Hampshire, United States
| 
|-
| Win
|align=center| 3–0
|  Daniel McWilliamson
| Submission (guillotine)
| Fist Series: WinterFist 2008
| 
|align=center| 2
|align=center| 0:47
| Irvine, California, United States
| 
|-
| Win
|align=center| 2–0
|  Chris Reed
| TKO (punches)
| Primal MMA: Noche de los Muertos
| 
|align=center| 1
|align=center| 2:55
| Tijuana, Baja California, Mexico
| 
|-
| Win
|align=center| 1–0
|  Kevin Greenwall
| Submission (guillotine)
| Ultimate Combat Experience: Round 27 - Finals
| 
|align=center| 1
|align=center| 2:31
| Salt Lake City, Utah, United States
| 
|-

References

External links

 

1982 births
Living people
People from Chaykovsky, Perm Krai
Russian male mixed martial artists
Welterweight mixed martial artists
Mixed martial artists utilizing boxing
Mixed martial artists utilizing kickboxing
Russian male kickboxers
Russian male boxers
Sportspeople from Perm Krai